Divineis the given name of:

 Divine Deablo (born 1998), American National Football League player
 Divine Naah (born 1996), Ghanaian footballer
 Divine Ndhlukula, Zimbabwean businesswoman
 Divine Oduduru (born 1996), Nigerian sprinter
 Divine Fonjock (born 1984 or 1987), Cameroonian footballer